Leva Bates (born May 21, 1983) is an American professional wrestler signed to All Elite Wrestling. She also had a successful tenure on the independent circuit, most notably for Shimmer Women Athletes. She has also appeared in WWE on their developmental territory NXT under the ring name Blue Pants.

Professional wrestling career

Early career (2006–2009) 
Leva Bates was trained at the Team 3D Academy under D-Von Dudley and Bubba Ray Dudley (The Dudley Boyz), and made her professional wrestling debut in 2006. She spent the next three years wrestling primarily in the Southeastern United States, for promotions such as Southeastern Championship Wrestling (SCW) and Coastal Championship Wrestling. In SCW, she won the SCW Women's Championship on November 8, 2008, by defeating Betsy Ruth and Lexie Fyfe in a three-way match. She also appeared for World Xtreme Wrestling, beginning in 2009, wrestling against Betsy Ruth and Malia Hosaka, among others.

Shimmer Women Athletes (2009–2019) 
Bates debuted for Shimmer Women Athletes in 2009 at Volume 28, when she and Kimberly Kash lost a tag team match to Kacey Diamond and Sassy Stephie. She returned at the next show in 2010, defeating She Nay Nay in a dark match, before losing to Malia Hosaka on Volume 30. At Volumes 33 and 34, she lost to Allison Danger and Melanie Cruise respectively, before defeating Cat Power at Volume 36. Beginning at Volume 37 in March 2011, Bates formed a tag team with Allison Danger, known as Regeneration X. Over the next year, they defeated the teams of Jamilia Craft and Mia Yim, and Sassy Stephie and Nevaeh, but lost to Nikki Roxx and Ariel and The Knight Dynasty (Britani and Saraya Knight). On March 17, 2012, Regeneration X failed to win the Shimmer Tag Team Championship from Ayako Hamada and Ayumi Kurihara, and were unsuccessful again in a four-way match at Volume 48 the next day. In 2013, Bates returned to singles competition, and unsuccessfully challenged Cheerleader Melissa for the Shimmer Championship on October 19 at Volume 58. She spent the rest of 2013 and 2014 wrestling matches against Nikki Storm, Marti Belle, Veda Scott, and Jessicka Havok.

Shine Wrestling (2012–2019) 

Bates debuted in Shine Wrestling at their first event in July 2012. Initially a singles competitor, she faced Mercedes Martinez, Portia Perez, and Jessicka Havok, before having a series of matches with Kimberly, with the pair trading wins. This prompted at a Last Woman Standing match at Shine 7, which Bates won. After being attacked post-match by Kimberly, they faced off again at Shine 8 in a Fans Bring the Weapons I Quit match, which Kimberly won by referee stoppage. The feud ended at Shine 9, when Bates won an "Arkham Asylum" steel cage match. Bates then competed in the tournament to determine the inaugural Shine Champion; she defeated Taylor Made before losing to Mia Yim. This was followed by a feud with Nevaeh, which culminated in a hardcore match at Shine 15 won by Bates.

In February 2014, Bates teamed with Mia Yim to enter the tournament to determine the inaugural Shine Tag Team Champions. Collectively known as The Lucha Sisters, Bates and Yim defeated The Kimber Bombs (Cherry Bomb and Kimber Lee) and Jessie Belle Smothers and Sassy Stephie en route to the final, where they defeated Made in Sin (Taylor Made and Allysin Kay) to win the championship. They successfully defended the title against Evie and Madison Eagles, and Candice LeRae and Ivelisse, before losing to Legendary (Brandi Wine and Malia Hosaka) at Shine 20 on June 27, 2014. The Lucha Sisters failed to regain the championship in a rematch at Shine 21 in August. Bates then transitioned back in singles competition, and unsuccessfully challenged LuFisto for the Shine Championship in 2017.

WWE NXT (2014–2015) 
Bates first appeared in WWE, accompanying Adam Rose as one of his "Rosebuds". Bates made her debut in WWE's developmental territory on the October 16, 2014, episode of NXT, as an enhancement talent, losing to the debuting Carmella. She was introduced as "Blue Pants" by Enzo Amore and Colin Cassady because of her blue ring attire, and retained the name for her subsequent appearances. She returned at the NXT television tapings on October 23, losing again to Carmella; the match aired on November 27. Blue Pants earned her first victory on the January 1, 2015, episode of NXT, defeating Carmella in their third match. She made further appearances on the February 18, April 15, and June 10 episodes, losing to NXT Women's Champion Sasha Banks, Dana Brooke, and Emma respectively. Blue Pants made a surprise appearance at NXT TakeOver: Brooklyn on August 22, managing The Vaudevillains (Aiden English and Simon Gotch) to a NXT Tag Team Championship. During the match, she had an altercation with Alexa Bliss, prompting a match on the September 2 episode of NXT, which Bliss won. Blue Pants made her final appearance on the December 2 episode of NXT, facing Nia Jax in a losing effort.

Bates described the character of Blue Pants as the "ultimate fangirl", and felt the character became so popular because the audience connected with the joy the character felt in wrestling. Blue Pants was noted to be very popular with the crowd at NXT shows, receiving enthusiastic applause and cheering when she appeared, despite being intended initially only as an enhancement talent and not being under contract with WWE.

Other promotions (2008–2019) 

Bates appeared on the May 28, 2008, episode of Total Nonstop Action Wrestling's Impact!, accepting Awesome Kong's $25,000 challenge, which she would lose. She later had a try-out match for the company against Isis the Amazon in February 2011, but lost the match. In September 2012, Bates made a further appearance on Impact Wrestling, portraying a villainous stagehand who helped the Aces & Eights faction abduct Sting and Hulk Hogan. Bates made a brief return to TNA for the Knockouts Knockdown 2016 pay-per-view as her cosplayer character losing a well received match to TNA Knockouts champion Jade. Bates returned to Impact Wrestling again for One Night Only: Victory Road – Knockouts Knockdown defeating Allie. Later the same night she teamed with ODB, Alisha, and Santana Garrett in an eight-man tag team match where they defeated Angelina Love, Rosemary, Diamanté, and Laurel Van Ness.

Bates debuted in Full Impact Pro (FIP) in May 2008, when she and Rain defeated Portia Perez and Mimi in a tag team match. She returned five years later, as part of a Shine Wrestling showcase match against Solo Darling on August 9, 2013. She continued making appearances for FIP throughout 2013 and 2014, as the manager of Dos Ben Dejos (Jay Rios and Eddie Cruz), along with Mia Yim. She also made sporadic wrestling appearances for the company, usually against Darling or Su Yung.

All Elite Wrestling (2019-present) 
On April 22, 2019, it was announced that Bates would join the women's roster of All Elite Wrestling as The Librarian. She debuted at Fyter Fest, losing to Allie in a singles match after a superkick. She turned face after slapping Peter Avalon.

Other media 

Bates has been a livestreamer on the live streaming platform Twitch since September 2020.

Personal life 

Bates has a degree in theater and radio and television production with a minor in dance from Murray State University. She works during the week as one of the entertainers at the Universal Orlando theme park. She also video blogs for The Geek Soapbox.

Bates is known for her use of cosplay in her ring outfits; she regularly dresses as characters from TV, movies, video games, and comic books. While cosplaying, she incorporates aspects of the character into her wrestling style.

Championships and accomplishments 
 Atomic Revolutionary Wrestling 
 ARW Bombshells Championship (1 time)
 Atomic Wrestling Entertainment
 AWE Bombshells Championship (1 time)
 Coastal Championship Wrestling
 CCW Women's Championship (1 time)
 Heavy on Wrestling 
 HOW Women's Championship (1 time, inaugural)
 Pro Wrestling Illustrated
 PWI Feud of the Year (2012) 
 Ranked No. 28 of the best 50 female singles wrestlers in the PWI Female 50 in 2015
 Shimmer Wrestling
 Shimmer Tag Team Championship (1 time) – with Delilah Doom
 Shine Wrestling
 Shine Tag Team Championship (1 time) – with Mia Yim
 Shine Tag Team Title Tournament (2014)
 Southeastern Championship Wrestling
 SCW Women's Championship (1 time)
 Southern Championship Wrestling Florida
 SCW Florida Women’s Championship (1 time)
 United States Championship Wrestling
 USCW Women's Championship (1 time)
 Women Superstars Uncensored
 WSU Spirit Championship (1 time)
 WSU Spirit Championship Tournament (2015)
 WrestleCircus
 WrestleCircus Sideshow Championship (1 time)
 Wrestling Observer Newsletter
 Worst Gimmick (2012)

References

External links 

 
 
 
 

1983 births
All Elite Wrestling personnel
American female professional wrestlers
American YouTubers
Cosplayers
Living people
Murray State University alumni
People from Madisonville, Kentucky
Professional wrestlers from Kentucky
Sportswomen from Kentucky
Twitch (service) streamers
21st-century American women
21st-century professional wrestlers
Shimmer Tag Team Champions